A biscornu is a small, octagonal, stuffed ornamental pincushion.  It is usually made out of Aida cloth or linen,  sewn from two square sheets of cloth (forming the top and bottom of the cushion) in such a way that each corner of one square is hemmed to the middle of a side of the opposite square.

Embroidery, hardanger, and/or cross-stitch are used to decorate the top and bottom of the cushion.  A button is typically secured in the center of the cushion to give a small depression on the top.  Beads, tassels and other objects can decorate the biscornu.  They are typically able to fit in the palm of your hand.  The name is derived from the French adjective, biscornu, meaning skewed, quirky or irregular.

Mathematically, two squares joined together in the pattern of a biscornu will form the boundary of a unique convex polyhedron, by Alexandrov's uniqueness theorem. In the case of a biscornu, this polyhedron is a flattened square antiprism, with ten faces: two smaller squares (diagonally inset into the squares from which the shape is formed) and eight isosceles right triangles (the corners of its original squares) around the sides. However an actual biscornu will have a somewhat more rounded shape than this polyhedron.

See also
Paper bag problem, on the shape of a pillow formed by hemming two squares together corner-to-corner and edge-to-edge

References

Embroidery